Hege Kristine Kvitsand (born 14 June 1973) is a Norwegian handball player who played for the club Bækkelagets SK and the Norwegian national team in the 1990s. She was born in Trondheim. She competed at the 1996 Summer Olympics in Atlanta, where the Norwegian team finished fourth.

References

External links

Norwegian female handball players
Handball players at the 1996 Summer Olympics
Olympic handball players of Norway
1973 births
Living people
Sportspeople from Trondheim